The CERGA Observatory (obs. code: 010) was a scientific department and astronomical station of the Côte d'Azur Observatory in southern France, where several asteroids were discovered during 1984–1993.

Description 

CERGA included 28 researchers and as many engineers and technicians located on the Observatory sites of Nice, Grasse and Calern (Caussols). The scientific activities covered fields as diverse as fundamental astronomy, celestial mechanics, and space geodesy. CERGA was in charge of several observing facilities of the Lunar Laser Ranging experiment, for example, the lunar-laser ranging telescope and the two satellite laser stations.

By nature the scientific activity involved the acquisition of data and their processing, a dedicated instrumental development and a close relationship with the more theoretical aspects in dynamics and observation modelling.

CERGA was dissolved in 2004 when the parent Côte d'Azur Observatory re-organized. The main-belt asteroid 2252 CERGA was named for the observatory, where this asteroid was discovered by Kōichirō Tomita.

List of discovered minor planets 

The Minor Planet Center directly credits the CERGA observatory with the discovery of 21 asteroids made during 1984–1993. The discoveries were made using the observatory's 0.9-meter Schmidt telescope.

See also 
 
 OCA–DLR Asteroid Survey

References

External links 
 CERGA English home page
 http://www.oca.eu/
 CERGA observatory, www.beyond.fr

Astronomy institutes and departments
Asteroid surveys
Year of establishment missing
2004 disestablishments in France
Minor-planet discovering observatories